This is a list of endorsements for declared candidates in the Republican primaries for the 1928 United States presidential election.

Herbert Hoover

Frank Lowden

George Norris

Charles Curtis

Frank Willis

James Watson

References

1928 United States Republican presidential primaries